Santikos Entertainment (formerly Santikos Theatres) is an American movie theater and entertainment center chain based in San Antonio, Texas. The company was founded in 1911 by Greek entrepreneur Louis Santikos and was owned and operated by his son, John L. Santikos, until his death in 2014. In 2015, as part of his estate, Santikos Entertainment was donated to the San Antonio Area Foundation.

Santikos Entertainment is a for-profit company that exists for the sole purpose of giving back to non-profits in the San Antonio area in the form of donations, sponsorships, grants, and programming.

References

External links
 

American companies established in 1911
Companies based in San Antonio
Movie theatre chains in the United States
Theatres in San Antonio